Patrice Arthur "Nosey" Gauthier (March 14, 1904 – June 30, 1977) was a Canadian professional ice hockey centre who played 13 games in the National Hockey League for the Montreal Canadiens. He was born in Denver, Colorado, but grew up in Montreal, Quebec. He is buried in Montreal's Mount Royal Cemetery.

Gauthier played for the Galt Terriers senior amateur team of the Ontario Hockey Association from 1924 until 1927. He returned to Montreal to make his professional debut with the Canadiens in the 1927-28 season, playing 13 games in the regular season, and one in the playoffs. It was his only time in the NHL. He would play over 200 games in the minor leagues, with the Rhode Island Reds, London Panthers, Toronto Millionaires, Hamilton Tigers, Niagara Falls Cataracts, London Tecumsehs, and finally with the Buffalo Bisons of the IHL in 1931-32.

External links

1904 births
1977 deaths
Buffalo Bisons (IHL) players
Burials at Mount Royal Cemetery
Canadian ice hockey forwards
Hamilton Tigers (IHL) players
Ice hockey people from Quebec
Montreal Canadiens players
People from Montreal
Providence Reds players
American emigrants to Canada